Nutrition may refer to:

 Nutrition, the process by which an organism uses food to sustain life:
 Human nutrition
 Animal nutrition
 Plant nutrition
 Nutritional science or nutrition science
 Nutrition (journal), a medical journal
 "Nutrition", a song by Hieroglyphics from the album The Kitchen